Howie Made Me Do it is the second rarities compilation by American hip hop musician Ill Bill, released in December 2003 by Uncle Howie Records. It is a compilation of mostly songs previously released on mixtapes.

The compilation contains nine studio tracks and seven freestyles (including a remix of a freestyle). "Nuthin" and "Dreams of Fucking a Porno Flick Bitch" were previously released on Necro and Ill Bill's Street Villains Vol. 1 mixtape, also released in 2003. "PF Cuttin Freestyle", "Green Lantern Freestyle", "Who's the Best" and "The Name's Bill" were previously released on Ill Bill's Ill Bill Is the Future mixtape, again released in 2003. "Gangsta Rap" and "How to Kill a Cop" were previously released on the "Gangsta Rap" single in 1999, as well as being re-released on Ill Bill Is the Future. Featured guests on the compilation include Necro (who performs on three songs), Cyn Roc (who also performs on three songs), E-Dot (who performs on only one song), Steven King (who performs on three songs, also not to be confused with the horror author Stephen King) and Q-Unique (who performs on two songs).

"Ready for War Freestyle" was also remixed for this release.

Track listing
 "Street Villains Freestyle 1" – 2:02
 "Nuthin" (featuring Necro) – 2:56
 "Howie Made Me Do It" (featuring Cyn Roc, E-Dot and Steven King) – 5:31
 "PF Cuttin Freestyle" – 1:22
 "Dreams of Fucking a Porno Flick Bitch" – 2:38
 "Street Villains Freestyle 2" – 1:05
 "Street Villains Freestyle 3" (featuring Necro and Q-Unique) – 2:50
 "Ready for War Freestyle" (Remix) – 2:21
 "Y'all Won't See Me" (featuring Cyn Roc, Q-Unique and Steven King) – 4:25
 "Street Villains Freestyle 4" (featuring Necro) – 1:48
 "Green Lantern Freestyle" – 2:21
 "In Da Hood" (featuring Cyn Roc and Steven King) – 3:05
 "Gangsta Rap" – 2:35
 "How to Kill a Cop" – 3:03
 "Who's the Best" – 2:39
 "The Name's Bill" – 3:22

Personnel
 Ill Bill – vocals, composing, writing
 Necro – guest vocals, production
 DJ Eclipse – production
 Cyn Roc – guest vocals
 E-Dot – guest vocals
 Steven King – guest vocals
 Q-Unique – guest vocals

Ill Bill albums
2003 compilation albums